Zhanna Leonidovna Agalakova (born 6 December 1965, Kirov) is a Russian journalist, special correspondent, and television news presenter.

In 2002 she was nominated for the TEFI Award and in 2006 was awarded the Medal of the Order "For Merit to the Fatherland".

Career
In 1992 Agalakova became the RIA Novosti news agency's gossip correspondent. From 1996 she broadcast on the NTV (Russia) channel.

In October 1999 she joined Channel One Russia, presenting the daytime and evening editions of Novosti ("News"), as well as the main evening news programme Vremya. In May 2000 she announced the results of the Russian professional jury's voting at the Eurovision Song Contest held in Stockholm. Between 2000 and 2002 she presented the television programme Vremena together with Vladimir Posner.

In September 2005 Agalakova became Channel One Russia's own correspondent in Paris and from January 2013 till August 2019 the station's special correspondent in New York.

From August 2019 she worked again in Paris, and since March 2021 she has specialized in covering events in other European countries as well.

Agalakova's last report on Channel One Russia came out on February 17, 2022. On March 3, 2022, she tendered her resignation from the channel, officially leaving it two weeks later, on March 17, 2022. Agalakova said she quit in protest over Russia's invasion of Ukraine, and said she believes Russian television was being used to spread Kremlin propaganda. In an interview published by the BBC, Agalakova described Russian TV as 'brainwashing' its viewers.

Personal life
Agalakova dated an Italian physicist, Giorgio Savona, since 1991. They married in 2001. The couple has a daughter.

References

External links

 Профиль Жанны Агалаковой (Profile of Zhanna Agalakova) на сайте Первого канала (on the website of Channel One)
 Биография Жанны Агалаковой (Biography of Zhanna Agalakova)
 

1965 births
21st-century Russian journalists
Living people
People from Kirov, Kirov Oblast
Moscow State University alumni
Recipients of the Medal of the Order "For Merit to the Fatherland" II class
Russian activists against the 2022 Russian invasion of Ukraine
Russian women journalists
Russian women television presenters